Liam Hutchinson (born 11 February 1991 in Pontypridd, Wales) is a Welsh footballer who plays for Haverfordwest County A.F.C. of the Welsh Football League Division One as of 2015.

Australia

Was voted as Bunbury Forum Force's Best and Fairest player for 2013.

Cambodia

Specializing in dead-ball situations, Hutchinson trailed with Cambodian club Phnom Penh Crown in late 2013, scoring his first goal for the team in a 7-3 friendly win over Albirex Niigata Phnom Penh. He then signed for the club in November that year, forming a foreign triumvirate with Nigerians Odion Obadin and George Bisan; however, in January 2014, the Welshman's stint in Cambodia was cut short as he left to Wales for personal reasons.

References

External links 

 at Soccerway

1991 births
Living people
Footballers from Pontypridd
Welsh expatriate footballers
Expatriate soccer players in Australia
Association football midfielders
Welsh footballers
Expatriate footballers in Cambodia
Haverfordwest County A.F.C. players
Expatriate footballers in England
Welsh expatriate sportspeople in Australia
Welsh expatriate sportspeople in Cambodia